Jordan Gelber (born 1975) is an American actor and singer. He has performed on Broadway in the musical Avenue Q, in All My Sons and in Elf the Musical, among other shows. He has also performed in many off-Broadway productions. He has a recurring role in the CBS TV show Elementary and in other television shows.

Early life and education
Gelber is the son of Donald and Barbra Gelber. He was born in the Riverdale neighborhood of the Bronx, New York City, and grew up in Woodmere, Long Island. Gelber has a younger sister, Marielle. Gelber is Jewish. In 1993, he graduated from George W. Hewlett High School in Hewlett, Long Island.

He attended the National Theater Institute.

He is a 1997 graduate of Stanford University, where he was a member of the Stanford Improvisors improvisational theatre troupe and an a cappella group, Stanford Mendicants.

In 2000, Gelber earned a master's degree in acting from New York University's Graduate Acting Program at the Tisch School of the Arts.

Career

Broadway
He is known for originating the role of struggling comedian Brian in the Tony Award-winning Broadway musical Avenue Q. Gelber also performed on Broadway in Arthur Miller's All My Sons as Frank Lubey from 2008 to 2009, and played Buddy in Elf the Musical from 2012 to 2013. In 2017, at the Hudson Theatre, Gelber played Louis/Billy in the limited-run Broadway revival of the Stephen Sondheim/James Lapine musical Sunday in the Park With George starring Jake Gyllenhaal and Annaleigh Ashford.

Additional Stage Performances
He has also been in two off-Broadway productions by the Exchange Theater, Realism and Jump!.

His other off-Broadway credits include The Polish Play with the Katharsis Theater Company and Birth and After Birth at the Atlantic Theater Company.

A particular performance he is less recognized for was in Elvis People at New World Stages.<ref>{{cite web | url=http://www.playbill.com/news/article/108039.html | title=Avenue Q'''s Gelber to Be Part of Elvis People Cast | first=Andrew | last=Gans | work=Playbill News | publisher=Playbill | date=2007-05-12 | access-date=2008-12-20 | url-status=dead | archive-url=https://web.archive.org/web/20080511204025/http://www.playbill.com/news/article/108039.html | archive-date=11 May 2008}}</ref>

Television and film
Gelber has a recurring role in the CBS TV show Elementary as the medical examiner Dr. Eugene Hawes.  He also appeared on the first three episodes of the HBO series Boardwalk Empire. His television work also includes a recurring role as CSU Tech Layton on Law & Order: Special Victims Unit and appearances in episodes of Law & Order: Criminal Intent, The Sopranos and Mr. Robot.

His film credits include a role in Riding in Cars with Boys opposite Sara Gilbert, the 2007 crime drama Before the Devil Knows You're Dead and The Taking of Pelham 123 in 2009.  In late 2010, he starred in the Todd Solondz film Dark Horse. In 2016, he played a supporting role in the boxing drama film Bleed for This.

He lent his voice to the video game The Warriors'' as Chatterbox, leader of the Hi-Hats gang.

Personal life
In November 2009, Gelber married Marsha Loeb, a senior online medical editor at McGraw-Hill. They have two sons, Henry and Dashiell.

Filmography

Film

Television

Videogames

References

External links

THE Q INTERVIEW: Lucy interviews Jordan Gelber

1975 births
Living people
Tisch School of the Arts alumni
Jewish American male actors
American male musical theatre actors
American male television actors
Stanford University alumni
Male actors from New York (state)
People from Riverdale, Bronx
People from Woodmere, New York
George W. Hewlett High School alumni